The Ottawa-Carleton District School Board (OCDSB, known as English-language Public District School Board No. 25 prior to 1999) refers to both the institution responsible for the operation of all English public schools in the city of Ottawa, Ontario and its governing body. Like most school boards, the OCDSB is administered by a group of elected trustees and one director selected and appointed by the Board itself.  Additionally, annually, two student trustees are selected per provincial regulation.

Every four years, within the context of the Ottawa municipal elections, an election is held within each of Ottawa's twelve trustee electoral zones to elect each trustee. Following election and annually thereafter, the Board of Trustees holds its organizational meeting, where the Board membership elects two of its members to the positions of chair and vice-chair of the Board.  Chairs and membership of each of the Board's committees are also determined as part of the organizational meeting. In addition to the twelve trustees, two student trustees are elected by their peers, providing opportunities for the student body to become informed and involved in Board governance.

History 
The Ottawa-Carleton District School Board was created on 1 January 1998 in accordance with Ontario provincial government legislation including merging of the former adjacent Carleton Board of Education and the Ottawa Board of Education.  The headquarters of the amalgamated school district is located at the former headquarters of the Carleton Board of Education at 133 Greenbank Road, Nepean.

Historically, and to this day, the OCDSB is one of the very few school boards in Ontario with an advisory council on the arts providing input and annual reports to the board of trustees.

In 2009-2010 the OCDSB tried to shut down the Alternative program, a group of students and parents from Lady Evelyn Alt teamed up with a trustee and won the Review.

In 2017 a family was awarded approximately $3,000 after winning a lawsuit against the OCDSB over the board's failure to take a student's complaints about bullying seriously.

In 2018 two former students filed lawsuits against the OCDSB for failing its "legal duty to provide for the safety of its students".

In 2019 an investigation was launched to look into what ultimately resulted in three sex offense charges against OCDSB teacher Majed Turk in July 2020. The alleged incidents occurred between September and November 2019.

As of 2020, there were ongoing lawsuits filed against the OCDSB for the sexual abuse of its students by now deceased teacher and Bell High School basketball coach, Donald Greenham.

In 2022 a disciplinary panel with the Ontario College of Teachers found former OCDSB teacher Peter Des Brisay guilty of professional misconduct after sexually abusing a former student in the late 1990s.

Schools and programs
The OCDSB has 147 school sites (117 elementary, 25 secondary including the Adult High School, plus five secondary alternate sites). Schools within the OCDSB provide English with Core French, Alternative, Early French Immersion, Middle French Immersion, Late French Immersion, Special Education, IEP's and gifted program.

Finances
The OCDSB has an operating budget of $784.8 million for the 2010–2011 school year. In 2007, the school busses belonging to the OCDSB and the co-terminus catholic school board were taken over by a new corporation: The Ottawa Student Transportation Authority (See external link, below)

Demographics
The OCDSB is the seventh largest district by school population in the province of Ontario. Enrolment as of 31 October 2007 totalled 72,388 students (47,099 elementary and 25,455 secondary).

The District has 2,711 full-time equivalent (FTE) elementary teachers and 1,337 secondary teachers, as of 31 October 2007, with 238 principals and vice-principals. In addition to the full-time teachers, approximately 2,494 teachers are on the district's occasional teachers list.  The OCDSB also has 2,059 administrative and support staff of whom 1,817 work in the schools.

The chair of the OCDSB is Lyra Evans.

Trustees
The following is a list of trustees elected to the school board since its creation.

Notes

See also

 Schools of the Ottawa-Carleton District School Board
 List of schools in Ottawa
 Ottawa Catholic School Board
 Ottawa-Carleton Educational Space Simulation
List of school districts in Ontario
List of high schools in Ontario

References

External links

Ottawa-Carleton District School Board
Ottawa Student Transportation Authority (OSTA)

public